Lady Margaret may refer to:

 Lady Margaret Beaufort, Countess of Richmond and Derby (1443–1509), mother of King Henry VII, and foundress of Christ's College and St John's College at the University of Cambridge
 Lady Margaret Hall, Oxford, a constituent colleges of the University of Oxford named after Lady Margaret Beaufort
 Lady Margaret Boat Club, the rowing club for members of St John's College, Cambridge
 Lady Margaret School, an all-girls' Voluntary Aided Church of England secondary school in Parsons Green, Fulham, London
 "Fair Margaret and Sweet William" or "Lady Margaret", traditional English ballad (Child 74, Roud 253)

See also
 Margaret Thatcher (1925–2013), the Baroness Thatcher, former Prime Minister of the United Kingdom